A Cisterna is a flattened membrane disk that makes up the Golgi apparatus, or one of the flattened membrane-enclosed sacs or tubes of the endoplasmic reticulum.

Cisterna may also refer to:

Cisterna d'Asti, an Italian municipality in the Province of Asti
Cisterna di Latina, an Italian municipality in the Province of Latina
 Battle of Cisterna, 1944
Castello di Cisterna, an Italian municipality in the Province of Naples
Piazza della Cisterna, one of the main squares of San Gimignano, Italy
La Cisterna, a place in Chile

See also
Cistern, a receptacle for holding liquids, usually water
Cistern (neuroanatomy), an opening in the subarachnoid space of the brain
Cistern (disambiguation)